Dighanchi is a village in Atapadi taluka of Sangli district in Maharashtra. This is situated on bank of River Manganga in Mandesha.

People
Dighanchi has all the castes of Maharashtra.. The Dighanchi has 65 percent open and other Backward Class also the Denotified and Nomadic Tribes namely - Ramoshi, Davari Jogi/Nath Panthi Davari Gosavi, Wadar, Kaikadi, Sangar Sangarsamaj Dhanager etc.

Temples

In the Dighanchi, is the Mahadev temple near Gram panchayat office. In Dighanchi Gramdevata is located the Siddhanath Temple. Another temple is goddess Mariai. Near the Dighanchi the Awalai temple is 3 km from the Dighanchi. From the Dighanchi the one km Khandoba Temple also durgamata temple 1 km towards north from Dighanchi.

Festivals
In the Dighanchi are celebrating the Hindu as well as Buddhist festivals. Traditional the population of Maratha is highly influenced by the Hindu Ideology. They are following the Hindu Festivals celebration. But the Bail Pola is celebrated highly prestigious in Dighanchi. the Bail Pola recession is taking place from the whole village. In the Dighanchi yearly Fair also celebrating. shivjanti, dighanchi festival in diwali, ganesh utsav, dahihandi. Dighanchikar Celebrate the Sriyal Shashti with Big Enthusiasm.A good fair including Wrestling Competition being organised.

Education
The Population of Dighanchi are based on the labor work and agrarian products, due to that they are found the 50 percent illiterate people in this village.

Educational Facilities
In Dighanchi they have the Primary School education facility. Dighanch High School Dighanchi is available for higher education, elementary and higher secondary education. In Dighanchi there is a separate Girls High School. The elite and rich from the Dighanchi area established the English medium School but the Backward castes are not able to accept education and employment in this village. Approximately 4 High Schools are there in Dighanchi. One I.T.I and Nursing College is also there in Indrabhagya Campus. One Agriculture Diploma college is also there.

Library
In Dighanchi the government funds the library - Reading room at village level. Recent books are not available. About 2 Libraries are there. Amongst that 1 called Nagarvachanalaya, Dighanchi is Strong Library and Namdevrav Kale Nagarvachnalay is also there.

Villages in Sangli district